Lambda Legal Defense and Education Fund, better known as Lambda Legal, is an American civil rights organization that focuses on lesbian, gay, bisexual, and transgender (LGBT) communities as well as people living with HIV/AIDS (PWAs) through impact litigation, societal education, and public policy work.

History 
Lambda's founder William J. Thom, Esq. submitted incorporation papers for approval to the New York Courts in 1971, but his application was denied on the grounds that its proposed activities would be "neither benevolent nor charitable in purpose" and "there was no demonstrated need for its existence". That decision was overturned in 1973 by the New York Court of Appeals, which is the highest court of New York State. (In re Thom, 301 N.E.2d 542 (N.Y. 1973).)

The original incorporators, in addition to Bill Thom, were E. Carrington Boggan, and Michael J. Lavery. At their first meeting on November 10, 1973, they elected to the newly constituted board of directors Rodney L. Eubanks, Shepherd Raimi, and D. Nicholas Russo.

Because of the scarcity of openly gay lawyers in 1973, Lambda Legal formed a Board of Advisors of prominent New Yorkers sympathetic to the cause of gay rights. They included US Congressperson Bella Abzug, New York State Senator Carol Bellamy, Association of the Bar President Merrell E. Clark, Rev. John Corn of Trinity Church and Martin Duberman, Distinguished Professor at City University of New York. Also on the Board of Advisors were two lawyers who later became New York State Supreme Court Justices: Phyllis Gangel-Jacob and Shirley Fingerhood.

From its inception, Lambda Legal sought diversity on its board of directors. Initially it could find no lesbian lawyers who were willing or able to be openly associated with a gay activist organization. Nathalie Rockhill, a major figure in the early post-Stonewall days of Gay Liberation, was the first woman elected to the board in 1974. She was soon followed by lesbian law students and, in time, by lesbian lawyers. By the 1980s, men and women were equally represented on Lambda's board.

Lambda's growth paralleled the growth of the gay movement. By the 1980s, with the crisis of the AIDS epidemic getting more attention, awareness of LGTBQ activism had grown significantly. Thomas B. Stoddard, who was executive director from 1986 to 1992, helped to author a bill passed in 1986 by the New York City Council to protect queer people against bias in housing, employment, and public accommodations. Mayor Ed Koch, who signed the bill enacting it into law said: "The legislation drafted by Tom Stoddard was perfect." In 1993, Stoddard and other nationally known gay leaders met with president Bill Clinton, the first such delegation to meet inside the Oval Office.

In 2013, Lambda Legal – Midwest Regional Office was inducted into the Chicago Gay and Lesbian Hall of Fame.

Its national headquarters remain in New York City, but today it has regional offices in Atlanta, Chicago, Dallas, Los Angeles, and Washington.

Work 
Lambda Legal has played a role in many legal cases pertaining to gay rights, including the 6–3 United States Supreme Court's 2003 decision in Lawrence v. Texas, which invalidated sodomy laws in the United States.

Lambda Legal carries out its legal work principally through test cases selected for the likelihood of their success in establishing positive legal precedents that will affect lesbians, gay men, bisexuals, transgender people and those affected by HIV. Lambda Legal's staff of attorneys works on a wide range of cases, with their docket averaging more than 50 cases at any given time.

Lambda Legal also maintains a national network of volunteer Cooperating Attorneys, which widens the scope of their legal work and allows attorneys, legal workers and law students to become involved in the program by working with Lambda Legal's legal staff.

Lambda Legal pursues litigation in all parts of the country, in every area of the law that affects communities they represent, such as discrimination in employment, housing, public accommodations, and the military; HIV/AIDS-related discrimination and public policy issues; parenting and relationship issues; equal marriage rights; equal employment and domestic partnership benefits; "sodomy" law challenges; immigration issues; anti-gay initiatives; and free speech and equal protection rights.
 	
Before taking on legal work on behalf of same-sex marriage rights, Lambda Legal had to resolve an internal debate over the significance of marriage for its constituency and the strategic wisdom of taking on the issue. In 1990, it declined to represent the plaintiffs in the initial challenge to Hawaii's denial of marriage licenses to same-sex couples. It filed an amicus brief in that case at a later stage and another in Dean v. District of Columbia, its first advocacy for same-sex marriage.

Lambda Legal publishes the "Little Black Book", which contains information regarding the possible consequences of gay men "cruising" for sex in public places. The "Little Black Book" includes the following material: "If you cruise in parks, bathrooms or other spaces open to public view, trust your instincts, be aware of your surroundings – and know your rights. While Lambda Legal and other groups are fighting against the ways police target men who have sex with men, having sex where others might see you and take offense can subject you to arrest, publicity and other serious consequences. If you feel unsafe, you should leave." The "Little Black Book" goes on to advise as follows: "If you’re cruising for sex and an undercover cop hits on you, what you do can still be a crime."

In July 2012, Lambda founder Bill Thom was interviewed at his nursing home in Manhattan, and gave a first-hand account of the early years of Lambda Legal. This resulted in a letter from the current co-chair of Lambda Legal to Bill Thom dated September 25, 2012, in which he says "The world is a vastly better place for LGBT people than when I started practice 20 years ago and is almost unrecognizable from the world in which you took on the heroic and unprecedented task of fighting back."

Represented by Lambda Legal, Immigration Equality and law firm Morgan Lewis & Bockius, in October 2020, the United States Department of State withdrew its appeal of the verdict in Kiviti v. Pompeo, and declined to appeal Mize-Gregg v. Pompeo. Federal district courts ruled the State Department’s refusal to recognize children born oversees to married same-sex, American citizen couples as U.S. citizens to be unlawful in both cases.

Following a 2017 Trump administration presidential order to ban transgender troops from the US military, Lambda indicated that they would be taking action to challenge the legality of the order. The order was blocked by courts until the Supreme Court allowed it to go into effect in January 2019, but was reversed two years later by executive order of President Biden, less than a week after his inauguration in January 2021.

In May 2022, Lambda Legal launched the first episode of its new podcast, "Making the Case," hosted by Alex Berg. Listeners will have the opportunity to learn more about the creative strategies, unique challenges, and passion that helped win some of the most significant cases for the LGBTQ+ community and people living with HIV in recent memory.

See also
 LGBT rights in the United States
 List of LGBT rights organizations
 Diaz v. Brewer
 Henkle v. Gregory

Notes

External links
 
 First-hand account Lambda Legal History – Bill Thom Remembers

LGBT political advocacy groups in the United States
Organizations established in 1971
Legal advocacy organizations in the United States
Transgender law in the United States
1971 establishments in New York (state)
Movements for civil rights
1971 in LGBT history
LGBT rights organizations
LGBT rights movement